Shangyou may refer to:
 Shangyou County, in Jiangxi Province
 China Railways SY (Shangyou), a steam locomotive